The 1995–96 Eastern Counties Football League season was the 54th in the history of Eastern Counties Football League a football competition in England.

Premier Division

The Premier Division featured 20 clubs which competed in the division last season, along with two new clubs, promoted from Division One:
Clacton Town
Sudbury Town reserves

League table

Division One

Division One featured 14 clubs which competed in the division last season, along with three new clubs:
Chatteris Town, relegated from the Premier Division
Histon, relegated from the Premier Division
Whitton United, joined from the Suffolk & Ipswich League

League table

References

External links
 Eastern Counties Football League

1995-96
1995–96 in English football leagues